The Brantly B-1 was a 2-seat, coaxial-rotor helicopter designed by Newby O. Brantly and constructed by the Pennsylvania Elastic Company, Brantly's employer.

Design and development

In 1946, Brantly started flight testing the B-1 prototype (NX69125), which used a 150 hp Franklin O-335 engine in the fabric fuselage and two three-bladed rotors that rotated at 320 rpm and were fitted coaxially. The collective, cyclic, and differential controls were enclosed in the rotor hubs and ran in an oil-bath. Each rotor blade weighed 5.5 kilos. It also had a fixed wheel undercarriage with a tailwheel under the tailfin.

Unfortunately, the design was too heavy and complex and was abandoned.

Specifications

References

External links
 Brantly Historical Photos

1940s United States civil utility aircraft
1940s United States helicopters
Coaxial rotor helicopters
B-1
Aircraft first flown in 1946
Single-engined piston helicopters